Nathan Sexton is an American professional disc golfer currently sponsored by Innova Champion Discs.  Among his most notable accomplishments are his 2003 Junior I Boys PDGA World Championship and his 2017 United States Disc Golf Championship win, which is his first PDGA Major title as a professional. He registered as a professional with the PDGA in 2004, but has only been touring full-time since 2013.

In addition to playing disc golf, Nate has been doing commentary for Jomez Productions with Jeremy Koling and Paul Ulibarri.

Professional career

Notable wins

Summary

*Through February 2020

Annual statistics

†At Year End
*Through August 2021

Equipment

Sexton is sponsored by Innova Champion Discs. He commonly carries the following discs in competition:

Drivers
 Destroyer (Star)
 PFN Xcaliber (Echo Star)
 Wraith (Star)
 Sidewinder (Star)
 Thunderbird (Champion)
 Sexton Firebird (Glow Champion)
 PFN Orc (Champion)*
 Teebird (Star)
 Teebird3 (Metal Flake)
 Leopard3 (Star)

Midranges
 Roc (KC Pro)
 Roc3 (Metal Flake)
 Caiman (Star)
 Mako3 (Star)
 Lion (Champion)
 Rat (Star)

Putters
 Dart (R-Pro)
 Aviar (DX)
 Firefly (Nexus)

* PFN is an abbreviation for "Pre Flight Number". Innova began printing flight rating numbers on their discs in 2009. PFN discs were manufactured before that time.

References 

American disc golfers
Living people
Sportspeople from Corvallis, Oregon
Year of birth missing (living people)